The Blackfriar is a Grade II* listed public house on Queen Victoria Street in Blackfriars, London.

It was built in about 1875 on the site of a former medieval Dominican friary, and then remodelled in about 1905 by the architect Herbert Fuller-Clark. Much of the internal decoration was done by the sculptors Frederick T. Callcott & Henry Poole.

The building was nearly demolished during a phase of redevelopment in the 1960s, until it was saved by a campaign spearheaded by poet Sir John Betjeman. It is on the Campaign for Real Ale's National Inventory of Historic Pub Interiors.

External links
The Blackfriar website

References

Grade II* listed pubs in London
Commercial buildings completed in 1875
National Inventory Pubs
Art Nouveau architecture in London
Art Nouveau restaurants
Blackfriars, London
Grade II* listed pubs in the City of London